Chionodes dolo is a moth in the family Gelechiidae. It is found in North America, where it has been recorded from Alaska to Yukon and south to British Columbia.

References

Chionodes
Moths described in 1999
Moths of North America